Eating meat among Nihang Sikhs employs technique of Jhatka is practiced by sects within Sikhism when consuming meat that is either hunted or farmed. This historical method of meat consumption is popular among Nihangs and Hazuri Sikhs who eat goats on the festivals throughout the year and distribute it as Mahaprashad among the rest of the Sikhs as part of Langar.

Origin of sacrament

The introduction of this religious rite is traced by Hazuri Sikhs to Guru Hargobind. It is also historically confirmed that this killing and consumption of goats was also performed by Guru Gobind Singh on the founding day of the Khalsa on his own followers. It should be kept in mind certain sects of modern Sikhs do not approve of Sikh meat consumption due to the Colonial era introduction of "Mahants" and "Udasis" into Sikh Gurudwaras.

Tilak sacrament at Hazur Sahib

The preparation begins with bathing the goat with water.  While the water is being poured on the goat, liturgical recitations from the Sikh scriptures of Japji Sahib and Chandi di Var are practiced. Thereafter, the goat is taken in the middle of the Gurudwara compound. One Nihang Singh holds the hind legs of the goat while the other slaughters it using Jhatka technique. After this, the head of the goat is taken in a saucer and its blood is applied to the weapons of Guru Gobind Singh, which are placed in front of Guru Granth Sahib.

Debate within community
There exists a debate within this community whether or not meat consumption is part of Gurmat, i.e., within scriptural sanction of Sikh teachings. Most scholars say that these practices are misunderstood and do not equate it with sacrificial slaughter found in some other religions. There are other Sikhs who have an ancestral history of conversion into the Sikh faith from Hinduism in which meat consumption is banned, and so they continue these practices as Sikhs. Others, Nihangs and Hazuri Sikhs in particular, however, argue the opposite and consider it Manmat, or product of self-willed minds, to regard Tilak sacrament not to have come directly from Sri Hargobind Sahib.

See also 

 Diet in Sikhism
 Jhatka
 Rehat

References

Bibliography
In the Master's Presence: The Sikh's of Hazoor Sahib, Nidar Singh Nihang, Parmjit Singh, Kashi House, 2008

Sikh beliefs
Sikh